Bernard Antwi-Darko,  better known as Laxio Beats, is a Ghanaian record producer and composer. He is best known for the production of Ghanaian rapper Guru’s hit single akayida in 2013.

Early life, music career 
Laxio Beats, the youngest of seven siblings, was born February 28, 1987, at Kumasi. He started his music career as the entertainment prefect for his high school. In 2013 he produce “akayida”, which won the 2014 Ghana music awards for hiplife song of the year.

Production credits 
 Geesus – "Kisses for Breakfast" ft Stonebwoy
Phootprintz – "Forgetti" ft Laxio Beats
TicTac – "Don't Let Go"
Revy – "Prepaid"
Guru – "Akayida"
Criss Waddle – "Girls Abr3"
Just-Ice – "Hold It"
Echo – "Akuaba"
Rebbel Ashes and Ajoejoe – "Mene Woa"
Akoo Nana – "Nahna Nahna"
Preachers – "Meyi W'aye"
Keche – "Body Lotion"
Bisa Kdeix Sarkodiex phootprintz – "Jackie Appiah"
Iyanya  – "Don't Fear"
Jeff Spain – "Higher"

References

1987 births
Living people
Ghanaian record producers